Stephen Busby FRS is a British biochemist, and professor at the University of Birmingham.  He is the chair of the Biochemical Society.

References

External links
http://www.jic.ac.uk/corporate/about/organisation/scienceandimpactadvisoryboard.html
http://www.astbury.leeds.ac.uk/Intro/SAB.html
https://web.archive.org/web/20120426002158/http://www2.bioch.ox.ac.uk/oubs/pastevents.php

British biochemists
Fellows of the Royal Society
Academics of the University of Birmingham
Living people
Year of birth missing (living people)